Ariel Atkins (born July 30, 1996) is an American professional basketball player for the Washington Mystics of the Women's National Basketball Association (WNBA). After a four-year college career with the Texas Longhorns, Atkins was drafted 7th overall by the Washington Mystics in 2018 and helped them reach the WNBA Finals. She then spent the 2018–19 season in Poland with InvestInTheWest ENEA Gorzów Wielkopolski. In 2019, she won a WNBA Championship with the Washington Mystics. For the 2019–20 WNBA off-season, she signed with an Australian team, the Perth Lynx.

College
Atkins played college basketball at the University of Texas in Austin, Texas for the Longhorns.

Career

WNBA
At the 2018 WNBA draft, Atkins was drafted by the Washington Mystics in the first round, as the seventh overall pick. Atkins would join a Mystics line-up alongside players such as Elena Delle Donne, Kristi Toliver & Natasha Cloud. In August 2018, Atkins was named to the All-Defensive Second Team in her debut season. Later in September 2018, Atkins was also named to the All-Rookie Team.

On October 10, 2019, Atkins and the Mystics took home their first WNBA Championship after defeating the Connecticut Sun, 3–2. In September 2020, Atkins was named to the All-Defensive Second Team for the third time in her three career seasons.

Career statistics

College 

|-
|2014–15
| align="left" |Texas
|27
|19
|23.9
|.363
|.288
|.825
|3.4
|1.3
|1.2
|0.2
|2.2
|9.7
|-
| 2015–16
| align="left" | Texas
|27
|14
|21.0
|.536
|.356
|.819
|3.9
|1.3
|1.3
|0.2
|1.4
|11.2
|-
|2016–17
| align="left"|Texas
|32
|32
|26.6
|.456
|.377
|.818
|4.2
|1.6
|2.0
|0.3
|1.4
|12.8
|-
|2017–18
| align="left"|Texas
|35
|35
|27.7
|.534
|.420
|.859
|5.5
|3.2
|2.5
|0.6
|2.0
|14.9
|-
|Career
|
|121
|100
|25.1
|.475
|.373
|.831
|4.3
|1.9
|1.8
|0.4
|1.7
|12.4

WNBA

Regular season

|-
| align="left" | 2018
| align="left" | Washington
| 29 || 24 || 22.5 || .432 || .357 || .824 || 2.4 || 2.1 || 1.3 || 0.3 || 1.3 || 11.3
|-
| style="text-align:left;background:#afe6ba;" | 2019†
| align="left" | Washington
| 33 || 33 || 24.3 || .416 || .357 || .811 || 2.8 || 1.9 || 1.5 || 0.5 || 1.0 || 10.3
|-
| align="left" | 2020
| align="left" | Washington
| 22 || 22 || 31.0 || .438 || .411 || .886 || 2.9 || 2.4 || 1.8 || 0.3 || 1.9 || 14.8
|-
| align="left" | 2021
| align="left" | Washington
| 30 || 30 || 30.6 || .407 || .359 || .831 || 2.8 || 2.6 || 1.6 || 0.5 || 2.0|| 16.2
|-
| align="left" | 2022
| align="left" | Washington
| 36 || 36 || 30.0 || .420 || .365 || .845 || 3.3 || 2.3 || 1.4 || 0.3 || 1.4 || 14.6
|-
| align="left" | Career
| align="left" | 5 years, 1 team
| 150 || 145 || 27.6 || .421 || .367 || .841 || 2.8 || 2.3 || 1.5 || 0.4 || 1.5 || 13.4
|}

Playoffs

|-
| align="left" | 2018
| align="left" | Washington
| 9 || 9 || 27.9 || .480 || .424 || .879 || 3.7 || 1.9 || 1.1 || 0.1 || 0.8 || 15.2
|-
| style="text-align:left;background:#afe6ba;" | 2019†
| align="left" | Washington
| 9 || 9 || 19.8 || .373 || .333 || .929 || 2.7 || 2.3 || 0.8 || 0.0 || 1.2 || 7.3
|-
| align="left" | 2020
| align="left" | Washington
| 1 || 1 || 36.0 || .375 || .000 || 1.000 || 4.0 || 4.0 || 2.0 || 0.0 || 0.0 || 13.0
|-
| align="left" | 2022
| align="left" | Washington
| 2 || 2 || 33.0 || .379 || .500 || 1.000 || 1.5 || 5.5 || 0.5 || 0.0 || 1.0 || 15.5
|-
| align="left" | Career
| align="left" | 4 years, 1 team
| 21 || 21 || 25.3 || .426 || .390 || .900 || 3.0 || 2.5 || 1.0 || 0.0 || 1.0 || 11.8
|}

References

External links

WNBA player profile
Texas Longhorns bio

1996 births
Living people
American expatriate basketball people in Australia
American expatriate basketball people in Poland
American women's basketball players
Basketball players at the 2020 Summer Olympics
Basketball players from Dallas
Medalists at the 2020 Summer Olympics
Olympic gold medalists for the United States in basketball
Perth Lynx players
Shooting guards
Texas Longhorns women's basketball players
Washington Mystics draft picks
Washington Mystics players
Women's National Basketball Association All-Stars
United States women's national basketball team players